South African Institute for Maritime Research (SAIMR or SAIMAR, pronounced ) is the name of a paramilitary organization that is believed to have performed clandestine operations to support white supremacy in Africa.

SAIMR first became publicly known during sessions of the South African Truth and Reconciliation Committee (TRC) in August 1998. A year before the second elections after the end of Apartheid, documents emerged implying SAIMR had a role in a plot to kill Dag Hammarskjöld, the UN Secretary-General, in 1961.

Letters with SAIMR’s official letterhead were found during the TRC hearings. The letters suggested that MI6 and the CIA had agreed that Hammarskjöld should be removed, a suggestion both organizations denied. 

While conducting research on her 2011 book about the plane crash that killed Hammarskjöld, Susan Williams noticed that the original documents from the TRC have disappeared.

A report by the United Nations prepared in 2014 noted that the details provided in the SAIMR documents lent some credence to theories that Hammarskjöld may have been assassinated, but noted that neither the authenticity of the documents nor their contents could be verified.

The documentary Cold Case Hammarskjöld, which premiered in January 2019, brought renewed media attention to these claims. The documentary discloses testimony from an alleged ex-SAIMR operative that SAIMR deliberately spread HIV among black people in Africa.

The documentary also claims that the mother of a young woman named Dagmar Feil tried to bring the killing of her daughter to the attention of the TRC, implying that her daughter had worked with SAIMR to spread HIV among black people and had wanted to make that public.

References 

White supremacy in South Africa
South Africa articles needing attention
Paramilitary organisations based in South Africa